United Nations Security Council Resolution 38, adopted on January 17, 1948, called upon the governments of the new dominions of India and Pakistan to refrain from in any way aggravating the situation in Kashmir, and deploy any means at their disposal to improve it.  It further requests both governments inform the council of any material changes in the situation while it is under the Council’s consideration.

The resolution was approved nine votes to none, with Ukrainian SSR and the Soviet Union abstaining.

See also
List of United Nations Security Council Resolutions 1 to 100 (1946–1953)

References
Text of the Resolution at undocs.org

External links
 

 0038
 0038
1948 in India
1948 in Pakistan
January 1948 events